Cult of One is the fourth full-length studio album by American thrash metal band Whiplash. It was released on Massacre Records in 1996 and follows a seven-year absence of the band after 1989's Insult to Injury. A different vocalist and bass player, and an additional guitarist joined originals Tony Portaro and Tony Scaglione – a line-up which again changed for the following year's offering, Sit Stand Kneel Prey.

Track listing
"Such is the Will" – 6:20  
"No One's Idol" – 5:24  
"No Fear to Tread" – 5:13  
"1,000 Times" – 6:52  
"Wheel of Misfortune" – 5:23  
"Heavenaut" – 7:50  
"Lost World" – 5:26  
"Cult of One" – 8:28  
"Enemy" – 4:32  
"Apostle of Truth" – 6:51

Credits
 Rob Gonzo – vocals
 Tony Portaro – guitar
 Warren Conditi – guitar
 James Preziosa – bass
 Tony Scaglione – drums
 Michael Pinnella – keyboards on tracks 7, 8, 10

References

Groove metal albums
Thrash metal albums

External links
Massacre Records album page
Roadrunner Records band page
BNR Metal discography page
Encyclopaedia Metallum album entry

1996 albums
Whiplash (band) albums
Massacre Records albums